Ashley Revell (born 1971 in Maidstone, Kent) is an English entrepreneur.

In 2004 he sold all his possessions, including his clothes, and on 11 April he gambled US$135,300 (about £76,840 at the time) on a single spin of a roulette wheel in the Plaza Hotel & Casino, Las Vegas. Revell even changed his name by deed poll to "Ashley Blue Square Revell" after the UK online bookmaker contributed to his gambling fund. He raised additional cash through car boot sales and auctions.

Having placed his chips on red, the ball ended up on 7, a red, and Revell doubled his money to $270,600. Revell used his winnings to set up an online poker company called Poker UTD, which later went out of business in 2012 due to controversy over US frozen accounts.

The event was filmed by Sky One as a reality mini-series titled Double or Nothing. He was also featured in an E! documentary special along with Stu Ungar called THS Investigates: Vegas Winners & Losers.

An episode of the television series Las Vegas entitled "One Nation, Under Surveillance", first broadcast on 14 March 2005, had a character and event loosely based on Revell.

Simon Cowell said that Revell's bet was the inspiration behind his 2011–2012 game show called Red or Black?.

Revell also owned iGaming Recruitment, a website that matched online gambling companies with job applicants.

References

External links
CNN Interview with Revell
Video of the Bet

1971 births
Living people
English gamblers